A list of films produced by the Turkish film industry in Turkey in 2010.

Highest-grossing films

Events
January
30 — New Turkish Cinema by  Asuman Suner published.
February
16 — Honey directed by Semih Kaplanoğlu premiered at the 60th Berlin International Film Festival where it won the coveted Golden Bear award.
March
10 — The 21st Ankara International Film Festival opened with a gala at the Presidential Symphony Orchestra (CSO) Concert Hall.
19 — Loose Cannons directed by Turkish-Italian director Ferzan Özpetek had its Turkish premier at the Nakıp Ali Cinema Complex in Gaziantep.
23 — The 3rd Yeşilçam Awards ceremony gave top award to Nefes: Vatan Sağolsun.
30 — Büyük Oyun won the Golden Reel Award for Best Cinematography at the Tiburon International Film Festival in San Francisco.
April
1 — The 29th International Istanbul Film Festival opened with a gala at the Istanbul Lütfi Kırdar Convention and Exhibition CenterLütfi Kırdar Congress Exhibition Hall.
May
6 — The 13th Flying Broom International Women’s Film Festival opened in Ankara with a ceremony at the State Opera and Ballet Hall.
11 — Taner Birsel wins best actor prize the 5th Monaco Charity Film Festival.
September
21 — The 17th Adana "Golden Boll" International Film Festival officially opened with a screening of La Mujer sin Piano by Javier Rebollo at the city's municipal theater.

Released films

January to June

July to December

See also
2010 in Turkey

References

2010
Turkey
Films